Bride of the Water God (하백의 신부 "Habaek-eui Shinbu") is a sunjung manhwa by Yun Mi-kyung. The first volume was released in 2006 by Seoul Munhwasa, however an English version was released in 2007 by Dark Horse Comics. The original series ended in 2014, while the English version is still ongoing.

Synopsis
Soah is a girl from a small village suffering from a long, devastating drought. In order to appease the Water God, the most beautiful girl from the village must be sacrificed. Soah is chosen to become Habaek's bride, but instead of dying at the hands of a monster, she is unexpectedly rescued by Habaek and brought to his Kingdom.

As Soah learns to live in a strange new world filled with gods, she is caught up in various intrigues surrounding Habaek and finds it increasingly difficult to know whom she can trust. In the midst of such trouble, she finds she has fallen in love with Mui, unaware that he is the true form of Habaek.

The story was based on many old traditional Korean Gods such as Tae-eul-Jin-in and Suh-Wang-mo, Yanghee.

Characters

Main characters
 Soah
 A girl from a small village chosen as the sacrifice to please the Water God, Habaek. When she was a child, she was prophesied to love two men in her life. She finds herself attracted to Mui, who she believes is Habaek's cousin, unaware that Habaek and Mui are the same person.  Soah refers to herself as a false bride; it is revealed that her father sold her to take the place of another girl intended for sacrifice.  Her uncertainty towards Mui and fear of trusting him results in her becoming a pawn for the emperor of the gods to use against Habaek.  
 Habaek ( (Hébó); lit. Count of River)
 The Water God, a temperamental deity who has not allowed rain to fall in Soah's village for many years and required a yearly offering of the most beautiful woman as a bride.  He is a child by day (Habaek) and an adult (Mui) by night, with his powers being reduced in the presence of heat or sunlight due to the curse cast by his first love.  Habaek is able to use pools of water to see anything as long as it is reflected in the water. His bride, Soah does not know of his transformations. Despite his unpredictable nature, he is actually kindhearted, which has caused him troubles.  He was deeply in love with his first wife, Nakbin, and promised to return to her no matter what form she may reincarnate and his continued longing and inability of letting her go even after her death and even when he falls in love with Soah, caused insecurities and troubles to his current bride.

The Water Country
 Hu-ye
 The commander of the Water Kingdom, also famed for being the best archer in the realm of gods.  He appears to be loyal to Habaek, particularly after an unspoken incident involving Nakbin in the past.  However, as of Volume 5, he appears to be under a 'contract' of some sort with the Emperor, concerning Soah. On her arrival in the Water Kingdom, Soah at first mistakes him for the Water God, and later comes to rely on him as a confidante and friend, which makes Habaek jealous, more so since Hoo-ye is attracted to her.  Though Habaek seems to trust him, the Water God is well-aware that Hoo-ye previously served the Emperor.  He is later revealed to be Nakbin's brother and also the son of the Emperor.  Because he loved Nakbin dearly, he is tricked into believing that Habaek is responsible for Nakbin's death, though in truth, Nakbin had actually killed herself.
 Mura
 The Witch of Chung Yo Mountains, who resides in the Water Kingdom and is knowledgeable with herbs and potions.  She is in love with Habaek, who referred to her as a "goddess" out of kindness; however, because her love is unreciprocated, she resents Soah.  She is especially adverse to Yeo-wa when she appears in the Water Kingdom with Nakbin's appearance.  Mura was previously involved in schemes with the Emperor against Habaek and her loyalties remain ambiguous.  Like several characters, she seems to know more than she is willing to tell Soah and appears to have her own agenda.  
 Ju-dong
 The God of Fire. He loves everything that is cute.  He once stole a peach from Suh-wang-mo's garden 400 years ago.  In the Emperor's war against Shin Nong, Ju-dong had hoped to be on the opposite side of Habaek in order to learn if he was stronger than Habaek.  In the present, he appears to be allied with Habaek and also Bi Ryeom; with the latter, Ju-dong makes an attempt to escape the Emperor's palace with Habaek, but the gods are forced to leave with only Soah.
 Yo-hee, Heedaein, Musanshinnyeo
 A goddess who is friendly to, and very fond of, Soah, going to the extent of rebuking Habaek for sending her away without warning and going to see her without taking anyone else along. Although she appears and behaves like an immature child, she is several thousand years old and is actually the mother of both Shin Nong and the current Emperor of the Gods.  When it was prophesied that her sons would destroy another, Yo-hee refused to kill one son over the other, which eventually led to the war between the gods.  Although Yo-hee has the ability to see the future, the only fates she cannot see are those of Soah and Habaek.
 Tae-eul-jin-in ( (Tàiyǐ Zhēnrén))
 A doctor and inventor in the Water Kingdom, a relatively recent inhabitant to the realm.  He appears cordial and at times comic, but is perceptive and secretive.  He appears to have his own motives regarding Habaek and Mura warns Soah not to trust Tae-eul-jin-in so readily.  It is revealed that he is the one who taught Nakbin how to put the curse on Habaek and only the person who placed the curse may be the one to lift it. Thus every year, a bride is sacrificed so that the reincarnated Nakbin would be able to return to the water country and lift the curse. To make sure that only brides who are Nakbin will enter the water kingdom, Tae-eul-jin-in has erected a barrier that so that any brides who are not Nakbin will not be able to enter but perish in the waves. He is revealed to be the Dragon King of the Royal Clan, who is supposed to serve Habaek; however, Tae-eul-jin-in remarks that he holds no actual allegiance to anyone but who he happens to choose and he intends to see if Habaek is worthy of him.
 Suh-wang-mo, Yanghee ( (Xiwangmu))
 The Queen Mother of the West and the Goddess of Death, she is Habaek's mother, a beautiful woman who is centuries old.  She is the Goddess of Punishment, Torture, and Disease, though ironically, she is also the Goddess of Love and Beauty.  Her vast lands contain the Divine Orchard, where a rare peach tree grows with fruit that can grant a human 18 000 years of life.  Habaek also does not appear to get along with her, though she seems to only want her son to be happy and wishes to protect him from the Emperor at all costs, even suggesting to the Emperor that she would bring him the life of Shin Nong, the previous emperor, if he would let her son go.  In her youth, she and the Emperor had been companions because their powers tended to ostracize them; it is implied that the Emperor had loved her, though Suh-wang-mo fell in love with Dong Wang Kong instead.  She has a rather absent minded servant named Cheong Jo.
 Yook-oh
 A grandfatherly butler who serves the Water God.  He previously served Habaek's mother and has known her since she was a child.  His devotion to Suh-wang-mo and Habaek is unmatched and he only wishes for their happiness.
 Yu-hwa
 The first daughter of Soah and Habaek, who possesses a strong resemblance to her mother.  Her name, which means "willow flower", along with the names of her unborn sisters, Huan-hwa ("wild cane flower") and Wui-hwa ("reed flower"), reflect Soah's desire for her children to bear the names of flowers that grow near water as a symbol of her gratitude to Habaek for saving her in childhood.  In the visions of the future known by the Emperor, Yu-hwa is said to be the child that Habaek loves most and she loves and admires her father greatly.  Before Yu-hwa's birth, Soah had left Habaek in order to fulfill a promise to Suh-wang-mo; as a result, Yu-hwa and Habaek are initially unaware of one another.  Because she was raised without a father, she is scorned by many children.  Though she admires Hoo-ye and wishes that he were her father as he is the only paternal figure in her life, she is happily united with her father after the Emperor's attempts to abduct Yu-hwa fail.  She lives with her family in the Water Country, but becomes the subject of gossip as she does not appear to have any divine powers, despite being a half-god.

The Imperial Country
 The Emperor
 The current Emperor of the Gods, known by the name Hunwon, and referred to as Shin Nong's younger brother. Hwangjae is old Chinese God-Emperor, meaning Yellow Emperor. He first appears in the guise of the dead Nakbin, shocking Soah, who thought that Nakbin had returned. In a later chapter he expresses interest in Soah, going so far as to snatch her out of Hoo-ye's arms. Hoo-ye is seemingly bound to him by a contract that concerns handing Soah over to the Emperor, though Habaek, as her husband, prevents him from taking Soah.  He is eventually revealed to be the father of Hoo-ye and Nakbin and had previously been close to Habaek's mother before she married Dong Wang Kong.  He schemes to obtain Habaek for the sake of winning a war against Shin Nong, a god who favours humans, while the Emperor despises them.  
Despite his cruel capriciousness, the Emperor's bitterness towards others appears to stem from how he would inevitably become distanced from others he cared about.  After he believes that his mother, Yo-hee, has rejected him in favour of saving Shin Nong, he befriends Suh-wang-mo because of their mutual loneliness.  He falls in love with her, but is disappointed that she does not reciprocate his feelings or take his proposal seriously, instead falling in love with Dong Wang Kong.  When Habaek's affinity with water is revealed when he was a child, it had been suggested that Habaek be killed so that his power would not weaken the Fire Gods'. Habaek's mother insisted that she would protect her son at all costs and as a result, Shin Nong declared that no Fire God is allowed to hurt Habaek.  Due to this divine, unbreakable covenant that Shin Nong put in effect, the Emperor desires to use Habaek against the Fire gods.  knowing that Suh-wang-mo would do anything to protect her son, the Emperor intends to use her against Dong Wang Kong and Shin Nong.
 Banwing
 A masked messenger who serves the Emperor.  He wears a mask as a result of Hoo-ye attacking him in the past after Banwing presented a message to Habaek and threatened the Water God and his wife.  He has made repeated indirect attempts to capture Soah, including going along with the schemes of Yeo-wa.
 Nakbin
 Habaek's first love - she is the very reason why every year, a bride must be sacrificed to Habaek. When she died, Habaek promised that he would return to her, no matter what her form is. She was revealed to be the very first person who Habaek met in the human world and initially thought that she was human. Because of her young age, Habaek promised himself that she is to become his bride and waited for her to come of age.  After their marriage, Nakbin would often speak of the spider lily, which represents a hopeful but tragic fate for lovers.  Hoo-Ye cared for her as she was his sister, she was very attached to him and despised humans for taking advantage of Hoo-ye.  While it is suggested that she willingly agreed to marry Habaek as part of Emperor's plans in exchange for saving Hoo-ye from death, her love for Habaek appeared to be genuine, in spite of her stating otherwise.  Tired of being a used for all sorts of things and unwilling to kill Habaek, Nakbin cursed him so that his power would diminish during the day so he won't be used against the fire gods, though Habaek commented that she could have just ordered him to die.  Nakbin apparently died long ago, though those bearing her appearance continue to appear before Habaek through the emperor's machinations. 
 Yeo-wa
 A crude-mannered woman sacrificed to Habaek as a bride and is rescued by Mui only at Soah's request, Yeo-wa schemes to get rid of Soah and take Habaek for herself.  She claims to be the woman who was supposed to be sacrificed to Habaek instead of Soah; when she is sacrificed later, the Emperor gave her Nakbin's appearance to use her against Habaek.  However, she genuinely falls in love with Habaek and begins to think she is truly Nakbin, but is eventually killed when she outlives her usefulness.
 Mok-rang
 A young woman whose ability to see the future through her dreams awakened when she was a child.  In one dream, she met Habaek, who recognized her as a shaman of water and revealed that he intended to marry Nakbin and that a terrible storm would strike her village.  It implied that the Emperor manipulated her into forcing the people of her village to sacrifice Nakbin to Habaek in order to gain Nakbin's loyalty.  Mok-rang initially appears as an attendant to the Emperor, going by the name Chunhoo, and holds a grudge against Habaek for apparently causing the deaths of her father and fellow villagers.  She is unquestionably loyal to the emperor, but hot-headed and often does not see beyond what appears before her.
 Gol-Sangcheon-Nyeo
 Known as the goddess of fortune, Gol-Sangcheon-Nyeo is the youngest daughter of the first Emperor of the Gods.  Known to have fostered Mura and loved her like a daughter, she blames Habaek for Mura's death.  Taking revenge by sowing doubts in Soah at the thought of living an immortal life, she also tricks Habaek into accepting a curse that will let him live as a human, though in the form of a child whenever he is near Soah.  In cursing Habaek, she also intends to hurt Suh-wang-mo, whom she blames for the causing the death of her lover, a human she selfishly imposed immortality upon so they could be together forever.  When Suh-wang-mo's revelation that her lover chose to die by Gol-Sangcheon-Nyeo's hands, the devastated goddess reluctantly lifts her curse on Habaek only when persuaded by her son, the half-divine child she had with her lover.

The Moon Palace
 Ban Chun Geun, Bi Ryeom
 The God of the Winds and ruler of the West Side Forest, who rescues Soah and Mui when they are stranded in the mountains.  He lives in exile for opposing the Emperor in the past.  Bi Ryeom is an old acquaintance of Mura, drawn to her by the kindness she showed him when she believed him to be an injured animal.  He comes to the Water Kingdom to fulfill a promise Mura had asked of him: to help Habaek as she had helped him.  He seems to have feelings for her, though also aware of Mura's unrequited love for Habaek.  Despite the risk, Bi Ryeom follows Mura to the Emperor's palace in order to warn Habaek that Soah has been captured by the Emperor.  However, when Habaek does not appear to recall Soah and Bi Ryeom is eventually caught by the Emperor, Bi Ryeom stages an elaborate escape and takes Soah with him.  He watches over Soah at the Lunar Palace and helps her reconcile with Habaek, and later accompanies them to the Chung Yo Mountains to confront Mura.  When Habaek refuses to kill Mura at her request, Bi Ryeom does so instead, to fulfill Mura's last request for him.  As Mura lies dying, he reveals for the first time his face, which he once told her would remain concealed unless someone was dying. With Mura's death, he kills himself.
 Yeom Jae, Shin Nong
 The God of Agriculture and the previous Emperor of the Gods, as the most powerful god.  He loves humans and gods equally, which eventually resulted in Hunwon gathering divinities opposed to Shin Nong and overthrowing him.  Once Mui's power over water emerged, Shin Nong granted him the title "Habaek" as the God of Water.  However, since Shin Nong's own affinity is toward fire, he and his allies retreated to the Moon Palace, where as gods possessing the power of fire, they are strongest. When Hoo-ye attempts to take Soah, he reveals himself and lets Hoo-ye leave the Lunar palace. He tells Habaek he never intended to meet him in the first place, and is too weak to fight against Hunwon now. He and the current emperor are brothers, but their very natures are opposite and it has been foretold that they will destroy each other.
 Dong Wang Kong, Busang
 The Lord King of the East and the God of Birth and Spring.  He is Habaek's father, as well as Shin Nong's closest and dearest friend.  Because of his own affinity to fire and his decision to ally with Shin Nong, he has separated from his wife and child, and Habaek has long since believed his father has died.  Despite his strong resemblance to Habaek, his temperament is entirely different - Dong Wang Kong is gentle and lax-mannered and has had few encounters with humans. When Hoo-ye comes to the Lunar palace to take Soah away, Mok-rang tries tricking Dong Wang Kang into going back to see Suh-wang-mo. Although he sees through the lie, he goes to where she is anyway to see her one last time.

Human World
 Dong Young
 A young man from a wealthy family who has known Soah since childhood.  It was intended he would marry Soah, but when Soah is chosen as the substitute for the intended bride to Habaek, the engagement fell through.  Though he is in love with Soah, she merely regards him as an older brother figure in her life.  When Soah is returned to the human world without any memories of her experience in the Water Country, Dong Young proposes to her and she accepts out of obligation to her family.  However, Mui arrives and takes Soah back to the Water Country before her wedding to Dong Young, who seems to give up on Soah because of the supernatural circumstances that spirited her away a second time.  When Soah and Habaek return to the human world again, Dong Young decides to take advantage of Mui's cursed condition to win over Soah again.
 Woo-Hui
 Dong Young's sister.  She was the actual intended bride to be sacrificed to Habaek, but her wealthy family paid Soah's family so that Soah would take Woo-Hui's place.  Upon seeing the adult Habaek for the first time, she is instantly smitten and confident that she can make him fall in love with her.  When she learns that he is Habaek, Woo-Hui admits that she was supposed to be sacrificed to him and makes it clear that she intends to make him love her, even when Mui rejects her without a second thought, because she believes that he would have married her if she had been sacrificed as intended.  Because Dong Young is in love with Soah, he encourages Woo-Hui's intention to pursue Habaek.

Spin-off

First announced in 2015, the live action version of the manhwa is written by Jung Yoon-jung, writer of the dramas Arang and the Magistrate (2012), Monstar (2013) and Misaeng (2014). The series will relocate the characters and story to modern day Seoul.

References

External links
 Official page for Bride of the Water God at Wink comics, the Korean publisher
Official page at Dark Horse

Fantasy comics
Historical comics
Romance comics
Seoul Munhwasa titles
2006 comics debuts
2014 comics endings
Comics adapted into television series